Noakhali Government Girls' High School is a girls' school in Noakhali Sadar Upazila, Noakhali District, Bangladesh, established in 1934, founded by late Uma Devi, a school in Maijdee for the girls' education. It was upgraded to a  government school in 1963. Now it is considered one of the prominent schools in the Noakhali district. Noakhali Government Girl's High School is situated in the center of Maijdee town.

References 

Schools in Noakhali District
Girls' schools in Bangladesh
High schools in Bangladesh
1934 establishments in India
Educational institutions established in 1934